Beni Mellal Airport  is an airport serving Beni Mellal, Morocco opened in 2014.
The airport is located near the township of Oulad Yaich.

Airlines and destinations
Beni Mellal does not have any scheduled services to other airports as of January 2023.

See also
Transport in Morocco

References

 OurAirports - Beni Mellal
 Great Circle Mapper - Beni Mellal

External links
 National Office of Airports

Airports in Morocco
2014 establishments in Morocco
21st-century architecture in Morocco